La Coma Heights is an unincorporated community and census-designated place (CDP) in Hidalgo County, Texas, United States. It was first listed as a CDP prior to the 2020 census.

It is in the northeast part of the county, on the south side of Farm to Market Road 490.

References 

Populated places in Hidalgo County, Texas
Census-designated places in Hidalgo County, Texas
Census-designated places in Texas